Ernst von Delius (29 March 1912 – 26 July 1937) was a racing driver from Germany.

Von Delius died at the age of 25 years at the Nürburgring Circuit during the 1937 German Grand Prix, having suffered a fatal collision with Richard Seaman.

Ernst was the brother of Carl Christian Alexander von Delius and Friedrich von Delius. His two surviving nephews are Carl Christian von Delius (Kalispell, Montana) and Curt Friedrich von Delius (Central Florida).

1912 births
1937 deaths
People from Elbe-Elster
People from the Province of Saxony
German racing drivers
Grand Prix drivers
Racing drivers from Brandenburg
Racing drivers who died while racing
Sport deaths in Germany
European Championship drivers